Werner Kiem (born 30 November 1962) is a former Italian biathlete.

Kiem won bronze medals in the 4 x 7.5 km relay with teammates Gottlieb Taschler, Johann Passler and Andreas Zingerle at the 1986 Biathlon World Championships in Oslo and the 1988 Olympic Games in Calgary, Alberta, Canada.

Further notable results
 1986: 1st, Italian championships of biathlon, sprint
 1987: 2nd, Italian championships of biathlon, sprint

External links
 databaseOlympics
 Werner Kiem, sports-reference.com

1962 births
Living people
Italian male biathletes
Biathletes at the 1988 Winter Olympics
Olympic biathletes of Italy
Olympic medalists in biathlon
Biathlon World Championships medalists
Medalists at the 1988 Winter Olympics
Olympic bronze medalists for Italy
People from Latsch
Germanophone Italian people
Sportspeople from Südtirol